Scabs might refer to:

Scabs (musician), drummer for Frankenstein Drag Queens from Planet 13
Derogatory nickname for strikebreaker

See also 
Scab (disambiguation)